Cerastoderma is a genus of marine bivalves in the family Cardiidae. It includes the common cockle Cerastoderma edule.

Fossil records
This genus is known in the fossil records from the Paleocene to the Quaternary (age range: from 58.7 to 0.012 million years ago).

Species
Extant species:
 Cerastoderma edule (Linnaeus, 1758) - common cockle
 Cerastoderma glaucum (Poiret, 1789)  - lagoon cockle
 (= Cerastoderma lamarcki [Reeve, 1845]) 
Fossil taxa:
 Cardium (Cerastoderma) calvertensium Glenn, 1904 †
 Cardium (Cerastoderma) patuxentium Glenn, 1904 †
 Cardium (Cerastoderma) waltonianum Dall, 1900 †
 Cerastoderma chipolanum Dall, 1900 †
 Cerastoderma latisulcum †
 Cerastoderma vindobonensis †

References

Cardiidae
Bivalve genera
Taxa named by Giuseppe Saverio Poli